Twelve is a 2002 novel by Nick McDonell about drug addiction, violence and sex among mainly wealthy Manhattan teenagers. The title refers to a new designer drug. The drug is referred to as a cross between cocaine and ecstasy. While Twelve follows the lives of a number of wealthy young adults, it centres on that of 17-year-old drug-dealer White Mike.

Characters

White Mike: Philosophical 17-year-old drug dealer who roams the streets of New York, peddling marijuana to rich teens. His mother died of cancer before the novel begins and his father is almost never around, leaving White Mike to his own devices. White Mike is very intelligent and never uses drugs, including alcohol. Wears an overcoat and jeans. He is the cousin of Charlie with whom he spent much time in their childhood. Shot by Lionel at the end of the book, but survives and goes to Paris to finish his studies.

Hunter McCulloch: Hunter is White Mike's closest friend. He is described as a beefy kid who often plays basketball at the rec center with black kids. At the beginning of the novel, he gets into a fight with a kid named Nana at the rec, and ends up splattered with a large amount of Nana's blood. When Nana is murdered shortly after, he is the prime suspect but is later cleared of all charges.

Chris: A plain 17-year-old young man who desperately wishes to lose his virginity to Sara Ludlow the hottest girl in his school. He is hated by many people but well known for throwing large parties.

Claude: Chris's brother. A psychopath, gun nut, and ex-cocaine abuser who collects bladed weapons, which he buys from a shop in Chinatown. Illegally buys an Uzi and goes on a shooting spree during a party at his house at the climax of the book, killing several of the party-goers. Shot by police shortly after.

Jessica: A plain girl who frequents many parties and becomes addicted to the drug Twelve. Agrees to sleep with Lionel during the climactic house party for more twelve when she cannot pay for it. Fate unknown.

Andrew: Friend of Hunter who is injured at a skating rink. Meets Sara Ludlow at the hospital and is highly attracted to her. Not a party person, but goes to parties to meet girls. Killed by Claude.

Sara Ludlow: The hottest girl in school. Sara is highly promiscuous and uses her feminine traits to get what she wants from Andrew and Chris. Fate unknown, presumably killed by Claude.

Lionel: Murderous drug customer who buys drugs from Mike and his cousin Charlie. Described as having yellow and brown bloodshot eyes. Kills Charlie and Nana at the beginning of the book. Hunter is blamed for the murders. Agrees to sleep with Jessica in exchange for twelve. Shoots White Mike with Charlie's gun and is killed by Claude as he tries to flee.

Molly: A friend of White Mike's who does not know he is a drug dealer. Very pure, never uses drugs or goes to parties.
Killed by Claude.

Timmy and Mark Rothko: Two wanna-be black boys who buy marijuana from White Mike. Speak in exaggerated hip-hop slang. Both killed by Claude.

Charlie: White Mike's cousin who got him into drug dealing. Killed by Lionel.

Nana:

Plot summary

Twelve is the story of 17-year-old White Mike, the privileged son of a restaurant tycoon. His mother succumbed to breast cancer several years before the novel began. White Mike is a drug dealer who has taken his senior year in high school off to sell marijuana to his wealthy peers. When he is not selling drugs he is reminiscing of his childhood and philosophizing about a world he feels he is not a part of.

The novel takes place over a five-day period in December 1999, beginning on the night of the 27th and ending on New Year's Eve. It is told in a 3rd person narrative and follows not just White Mike but many other characters, but despite this White Mike is the central figure in the book.

Part 1 -- December 27
The novel begins with White Mike thinking about his deceased mother and musing about the state of New York in the Winter. He then visits the rec center, where Hunter, a friend of his has gotten into a fight with a black basketball player named Nana. The fight ends with both covered in copious amounts of each other's blood. White Mike and Hunter head to a nearby Goody's, where they discuss college. White Mike then leaves to make a sale.

Hunter then leaves and goes home, thinking about the fight with Nana while listening to James Taylor on his discman. At home he makes sporadic conversation with his father, who is quite wealthy and a borderline alcoholic. Hunter then leaves the apartment and goes for a walk.

The narrative then shifts to Nana, who is going home to his apartment in the Harlem housing projects. Before he can get into his building he witnesses a drug deal between two shady characters, a pale white boy and a heavy black man. The deal then erupts into violence when the heavy man shoots the pale boy with a gun wrapped in a hand towel. Nana tries to escape but is killed as well by the heavy man, who pockets the pale boy's revolver before fleeing the scene.

We then shift to Sara Ludlow, the "hottest girl in school" and her girlfriends as they head to a party. They discuss school and their friends.

White Mike is at the party. He sells some pot to Chris, the boy throwing the party, but declines Chris's invitation to come in. After wondering how smart Sara Ludlow is, he leaves, musing about how rich everyone is.

We then meet Chris, the boy throwing the party, a 17-year-old boy desperate to lose his virginity. There is an overview of the party and we then meet Jessica, a school mate of Sara and Chris who heads to the bathroom to do some cocaine. Instead of cocaine she does a drug given to her by a boy. The drug is called Twelve. She takes some and is overwhelmed by the high that follows. She compares it to the first time she read The Gettysburg Address before passing out.

The narrative shifts to Claude, Chris's brother, and Tobias, a male model, taking a trip through China Town. They smoke some pot together and then buy bladed weapons at a shop. Claude takes home his weapons and arranges them in his closet, all in perfect order like some private shrine.

Part 2 -- December 28
The corpses of Nana and the pale boy are found. After talking with some boys who witnessed the fight at the rec center, two detectives place Hunter under arrest because of the blood still on his clothes.

Jessica wakes up and heads to the skating rink with some girlfriends. Once there, she accidentally injures a boy named Andrew by cutting his forehead with her skate. Andrew is taken to the hospital and the girls leave the rink. Jessica calls Chris and asks for White Mike's phone number, telling him that she wants more of the drug she had the party, Twelve.

At the hospital, Andrew undergoes surgery and is placed in a room for an overnight stay. He is placed in the same room as Sean, the high school football star who happens to be Sara Ludlow's boyfriend. Sean was involved in a car accident. Sara arrives to visit him and strikes up a conversation with Andrew. Andrew loans her his Dave Matthews Band CD, thinking it will make a good excuse to see her again.

Sara then goes to see Chris. She asks him to host another, bigger party on New Year's Eve, since his parents are out of town. Chris is apprehensive, but Sara tempts him with sexual favors so he gives in.

White Mike meets Jessica with Lionel, a mysterious drug dealer who supplies Mike with Marijuana. Lionel sells the Twelve to Jessica, who asks for Lionel's beeper number in case she wants more; Lionel gives her the number.

White Mike and Lionel then converse about Charlie, White Mike's cousin who got him into drug dealing and is away at College. It is revealed here that Lionel killed Charlie and Nana. He tells White Mike he has not seen Charlie, and departs.

Tobias heads to a shoot at the modelling agency. There he meets Molly, a fellow model who he is interested in. He takes Molly to Chris and Claude's where he is keeping his flesh-eating piranhas. After showing her the fish, he invites her to the New Year's Eve party and she agrees.

Hunter is placed under arrest for the murders of Nana and Charlie since the blood on his clothes is verified as Nana's. He finds he does not have an alibi.

Chris and Claude go to a cocktail party hosted by their aunt. Chris converses with a wannabe-author friend of his aunt's about The Beatles and Eminem.

After the party Claude returns to China Town with Tobias and illegally buys an Uzi submachine gun from one of the shops.

Part 3 -- December 29
Chris is having a boxing lesson when Sara shows up, requesting money for some Twelve which she will give to Jessica. Chris reluctantly gives her the money.

Molly visits White Mike, who is a good friend of hers even though she is unaware of his "profession". She tells him about Tobias and the party. White Mike gently tries to dissuade her from going.

Andrew is bored so he goes for a walk and ends up in Carl Schurz park where he meets and eccentric old man named Sven. He plays a game of chess with Sven, who beats him. Andrew feels he is being insulted by Sven and tries to leave, but Sven insists on taking him to a nearby pub for a drink. He does. At the bar, Andrew and Sven drink Scotch and Sodas and discuss school and Sven's old life as a merchant sailor. Feeling weirded out, Andrew leaves.

White Mike is walking home and sees Captain, a homeless bodybuilding black man, injuring himself by hitting a brick wall and calls an ambulance.

Part 4 -- December 30
That morning, Andrew calls Sara under the guise of getting his CD back. She invites him to Chris's party and asks him to bring weed. Andrew does not smoke pot but decides to score some anyway.

We are then introduced to Timmy and Mark Rothko, two unlikely wanna-be "cool kids" who get their kicks stealing CDs, smoking weed and speaking in an exaggerated hip-hop vernacular. They contact White Mike with the intent of buying some weed.

White Mike has a phone conversation with an old friend of his and Hunter's, Warren, and then decides to take a train ride down to Coney Island.

The perspective shifts to Sean, who has to go to the hospital for a check-up on his broken arm. He takes a taxi and is annoyed by the driver.

White Mike goes to Coney Island and observes people. Back on the train he gets the call from Timmy and Mark Rothko.

Jessica wakes up and watches the talk shows. She enjoys watching the "dregs of humanity" on television and holds a fake talk show with her stuffed animals in which she comments on a fictional school massacre. Here we are given the impression that Jessica may not be all there.

Timmy and Mark Rothko stop to buy cigarette usings a fake I.D. It fails and they threaten the store clerk, who in turn pulls an empty revolver on them. They leave all too quickly.

Jessica has lunch with her mother, who advises she visits a psychiatrist. She reluctantly agrees and wonders what she will tell her psychiatrist.

White Mike sells some weed to Timmy and Mark Rothko, who both irritate and amuse him with their lifestyle.

In jail, Hunter finally contacts his father through Andrew's father. Hunter tells his father he is frightened. Hunter's father remembers an incident that happened when he was in school, when a boy died at a drunken fireside party.

White Mike meets Andrew at the amphitheatre and sells him weed. White Mike is curious as to why Andrew is buying it. Andrew tells him it is for a girl.

Part 5 -- New Year's Eve
Andrew wakes up and decides to get a haircut. He does, then at home decides he looks bad. He decides to go to the party and resolves to get himself drunk.

Chris goes out and buys toiletries and condoms, thinking that tonight will be the night that he loses his virginity. He goes home and throws out his collection of pornography.

Timmy and Mark Rothko call White Mike for more weed. They follow him to his house, much to his annoyance. He gives them their weed and they talk about birds. Mark Rothko and Timmy then go to the supermarket and smash a container of Marshmallow fluff.
White Mike receives a call from his dad telling him Charlie is dead. White Mike breaks down and wonders who could have done it.
Jessica prepares for the party and to score more Twelve.

At the party, Jessica gives her cell phone to a girl who beeps White Mike for weed. White Mike rushes over.

Andrew and Molly meet in the kitchen and grow closer, deciding to head out for pizza when Lionel arrives.

Lionel and Jessica go upstairs and she realises she does not have enough for a bag. She offers to have sex with Lionel in exchange.

White Mike arrives at the party and in a fit of rage trashes the house stereo. He punches Chris when Chris attempts to kick him out.

He bursts in on Lionel and Jessica, who are having sex. Lionel pulls Charlie's revolver, which he took from the murder scene, on White Mike. White Mike realises Lionel killed Charlie and attacks him, only to be shot.

The gunshot causes Claude to snap, and he leaves his room armed with his submachine gun and sword. He goes on a rampage, killing many of the partygoers including Mark Rothko, Timmy, Andrew and Molly. After charging through the house, he steps outside and opens fire on the police, who fatally shoot him on the spot.

An afterword by White Mike explains that he underwent surgery for his wound and survived. It also states that Hunter was cleared of all charges after the bullets from Lionel's gun were examined. He also explains that he is now studying in Paris and that he likes it better than New York.

Inscription
After the title page is the inscription, "Dedicated to my father." The next page reads, "Can we please all stand and have a moment of silence for those students who died? And can we now have a moment of silence for those students who killed them?"

Film adaptation
The novel was adapted into a 2010 film of the same name directed by Joel Schumacher and starring Chace Crawford, Kiefer Sutherland, Emma Roberts and 50 Cent. Hannover House distributed the film in the United States, opening in 231 theaters on September 6, 2010.

References

2002 American novels
Dystopian novels
Novels set in New York City
American novels adapted into films